Koji Hirabayashi (born 5 January 1942) is a Canadian wrestler. He competed in the men's freestyle bantamweight at the 1964 Summer Olympics.

References

External links
 

1942 births
Living people
Canadian male sport wrestlers
Olympic wrestlers of Canada
Wrestlers at the 1964 Summer Olympics
Place of birth missing (living people)